This is a list of recreational caving fatalities in the United Kingdom. It includes all verified deaths associated with the exploration of natural caves and disused mines in the modern era (post 1880). Deaths involving members of the general public who may have slipped down a shaft, or wandered into a cave without being aware of the risks, have been excluded.

Caving cannot be considered a particularly dangerous pastime. In 2018, there were up to 4,000 regular cavers in the UK, and about 70,000 people who went on instructor-led courses into caves in the Yorkshire Dales, but there were no fatalities.

List of fatalities

The following is a list of the 136 identified recorded fatalities associated with recreational caving in the UK. The main causes of death have been drowning when cave diving, drowning as the result of flooding or negotiating deep water, injuries incurred from falling from a height, and injuries incurred as the result of rock falls. In ten cases the bodies have not been recovered.

The worst incident in UK caving history was the Mossdale Caverns incident in 1967 when six cavers drowned following an unexpected cloudburst. There have been three incidents when three people have died. The first was when three cavers drowned in Langstroth Pot in 1976 when free-diving short sections of underwater passage as the result of the air in an air bell becoming foul. Three cavers were killed by a rock fall in Ease Gill Caverns in 1988, and three cavers drowned in the Marble Arch system in 1995.

Porth yr Ogof, in South Wales, accounts for eleven fatalities, nine of which were the result of people drowning when negotiating the exit pool. Ease Gill Caverns and its associated entrances accounts for ten deaths; Alum Pot and its associated entrances account for six, as does Mossdale Caverns (all from the 1967 incident).

The only case of a caver dying in the UK as the result of becoming stuck was Neil Moss in Peak Cavern in 1959. The cause of death was foul air building up around him.

Breakdown of fatalities by cause and area
The following table summarises the major causes of fatality in UK caving by cause and by area. The commonest cause of fatality in the UK is drowning - accounting for almost half the deaths when cave diving is included, and 40% when diving is excluded. The second major cause of fatality, when cave diving is excluded, is falling from height which accounts for 23% of fatalities, followed by rock fall which accounts for 14% of fatalities. The 'Other' category includes gas poisoning and asphyxiation.

Breakdown of fatalities by cause and decade
The following table summarises the major causes of fatality in UK caving by decade.  The changes from decade to decade partly reflect the different numbers of active cavers, partly changing techniques, and partly improved equipment.

Breakdown of fatalities over time
The following bar chart shows the number of fatalities in each decade:

See also
 Caving in the United Kingdom

References

Sources

Accidental deaths in the United Kingdom
UK caving fatalities
Fatalities
Death-related lists
Deaths in sport